What follows is an overview of the main characters in William Shakespeare's Hamlet, followed by a list and summary of the minor characters from the play. Three different early versions of the play survive: known as the First Quarto ("Q1"), Second Quarto ("Q2"), and First Folio ("F1"), each has lines—and even scenes—missing in the others, and some character names vary.

Overview of main characters

Hamlet is the Prince of Denmark; he is son to the late King Hamlet, and nephew to the present King Claudius.
Claudius is the King of Denmark, elected to the throne after the death of his brother, King Hamlet. Claudius has married Gertrude, his brother's widow.
Gertrude is the Queen of Denmark, and King Hamlet's widow, now married to Claudius, and mother to Hamlet.
The Ghost appears in the image of Hamlet's father, the late King Hamlet (Old Hamlet).
Polonius ("Corambis" in "Q1") is Claudius's chief counsellor, and the father of Ophelia and Laertes.
Laertes is the son of Polonius, and has returned to Elsinore from Paris.
Ophelia is the daughter of Polonius, and Laertes's sister, who lives with her father at Elsinore. She is in love with Hamlet.
Horatio is a good friend of Hamlet, from the university at Wittenberg, who came to Elsinore Castle to attend King Hamlet's funeral.
Rosencrantz and Guildenstern are childhood friends and schoolmates of Hamlet, who were summoned to Elsinore by Claudius and Gertrude.
Fortinbras is the crown prince of Norway, and assumes the throne of Denmark after Hamlet's death.

Elsinore sentries

Marcellus, Barnardo and Francisco
Marcellus, Bernardo  (or Barnardo) and Francisco are sentries at Elsinore. Francisco gives up his watch to Bernardo in the opening of the play, and it is Bernardo and Marcellus, who first alert Horatio to the appearance of King Hamlet's Ghost. Marcellus goes with Horatio to tell Hamlet about the Ghost's appearance. Marcellus is the most prominent of the three.

Barnardo (in F1) is spelled Bernardo in Q2 (Second Quarto) and Barnard in Q1 (First Quarto).

Elsinore entourage

Voltemand and Cornelius
Voltemand and Cornelius are ambassadors sent by the King of Denmark, Claudius, to old King Norway.

Reynaldo
He is a servant to Polonius. (In the "Q1" text, Reynaldo is called "Montano" and Polonius is called "Corambis.") Polonius sends Reynaldo to Paris to spy on what Laertes is doing.

A Gentleman
He informs Gertrude of Ophelia's strange change in behaviour, before Ophelia's first "mad" appearance.

Osric
He is the courtier sent by Claudius to invite Hamlet to participate in the duel with Laertes. (This character is called "Ostricke" in the Second Quarto.)  Osric, as well as Polonius, attempts to engage with Hamlet in the elaborate, witty discourse, fully consistent with Baldassare Castiglione's 1528 work, The Courtier. This work outlines several courtly rules, specifically advising royal retainers to amuse their masters with inventive language.

The Players
The Players are a company of actors who arrive at Elsinore Castle.  Friends of Hamlet, they had earlier performed in "the city" (presumably Copenhagen), but faced stiff competition from boy performers, so they have traveled to Elsinore to offer Hamlet their services.  At Elsinore, they perform a version—which Hamlet has modified and called The Mousetrap—of the play The Murder of Gonzago in the "play within a play".

First Player or Player King

He is the leader of the troupe of touring actors. In the "play within a play", he takes the part of the king who is murdered.

Second Player or Player Queen 
This role was traditionally performed by a man, as were all the female parts in Hamlet, since women did not appear on stage in Elizabethan times.

Third Player
He is also called Lucianus in the "play within a play". The name may be a reference to Lucius in the Brutus legend, a source for Saxo Grammaticus' Gesta Danorum, itself a candidate source for Hamlet.
Plays the role similar to Claudius and kills the king by pouring poison into his ear.

Fourth Player

The Mousetrap play-within-a-play has a very brief Prologue recited by one of the Players.  The First Player may do the Prologue, but if not, a Fourth Player, with a speaking part, is probably required to do it.

Ophelia's funeral

Two Clowns (a sexton gravedigger, and a bailiff)

The bailiff informs the sexton that Ophelia's death was  suicide, but the sexton argues the point.  Later, the sexton unearths Yorick's skull, which leads to Hamlet's famous "Alas, poor Yorick" speech.  During the Interregnum, all theatres were closed down by the puritan government. However, even during this time playlets known as drolls were often performed illegally, including one based on the two clowns, called The Grave-Makers, based on Act 5, Scene 1 of Hamlet.

A Priest, or Doctor of Divinity
He officiates at Ophelia's funeral, and does not give her full Christian burial rites, since the church suspects her death was suicide.  Called a "Priest" in the First Folio edition of "Hamlet," his speech prefix in the Second Quarto is "Doct" for Doctor of Divinity, a Protestant clergyman.  Thus, the two original "good" printings of the play are in disagreement whether the clergyman is Protestant or Catholic.

Other characters

A Captain
He is a commander in Fortinbras' invading army, and is assigned by Fortinbras to get the license from Claudius for Fortinbras's army to be in Denmark.

Sailors (pirates)
The sailors are two pirates who deliver a letter from Hamlet to Horatio, informing Horatio that Hamlet has returned to Denmark.

English Ambassadors
They appear in the final scene to report that Rosencrantz and Guildenstern are dead.

References 
All references to Hamlet, unless otherwise specified, are taken from the Arden Shakespeare "Q2" (Thompson and Taylor, 2006a). Under their referencing system, 3.1.55 means act 3, scene 1, line 55. References to the First Quarto and First Folio are marked Hamlet "Q1" and Hamlet "F1", respectively, and are taken from the Arden Shakespeare "Hamlet: the texts of 1603 and 1623" (Thompson and Taylor, 2006b). Their referencing system for "Q1" has no act breaks, so 7.115 means scene 7, line 115.

Citations

Sources 
 Holland, Peter. 2007. "Shakespeare Abbreviated". In Shaughnessy (2007, 26-45).
 Marsden, Jean I. 2002. "Improving Shakespeare: from the Restoration to Garrick". In Wells and Stanton (2002, 21–36).
 Maric, Jasminka, "Filozofija u Hamletu", Alfa BK Univerzitet, Beograd, 2015.
 Maric, Jasminka, "Philosophy in Hamlet", author's edition, Belgrade, 2018.

Further reading 
 Shaughnessy, Robert. 2007. The Cambridge Companion to Shakespeare and Popular Culture. Cambridge Companions to Literature ser. Cambridge: Cambridge University Press. 
 Spencer, T. J. B., ed. 1980 Hamlet. New Penguin Shakespeare ser. London: Penguin. .
 Thompson, Ann and Neil Taylor, eds. 2006a. Hamlet. The Arden Shakespeare, third ser. Volume one. London: Arden. .
 ———. 2006b. Hamlet: The Texts of 1603 and 1623. The Arden Shakespeare, third ser. Volume two. London: Arden. .

 
Lists of theatre characters
 Hamlet, Characters in